The Thermoplan is a given name of the prototype of Russian lenticular-shaped hybrid airship.

Design features 
The key feature of Thermoplan is its combined structure with primary section having a torus of revolution shape (one variant was to construct this section hermetic and fill with helium instead of the shell helium section). This section supports the shell which has two sections one filled with helium and second with air that can be heated by the airship engines exhaust gas or cooled naturally. This design, based on the concept of a "rozière", greatly improves the manoeuvrability compared to an all-helium type.

Shell volume was 10660 cu. m. (376 450 cu. ft.) with its diameter of 40 m. The prototype had 2 Klimov GTD-350 engines (with 400 h.p. each), 1 Vedeneyev M14P motor (360 h.p.) and 2 electric power unit for vertical propulsion (50 h.p. each). Flight crew was 2 pilots.

Project history 
With a help of then MAI rector Yuri Ryzhov they obtained in second half of 1980s support from Gazprom for the start-up Design Bureau "Thermpolan" and first scaled prototype ALA-40 was constructed at the Ulyanovsk Aviation Production Complex and rolled-out in 1992. That was a rather small airship, and a full-scale model was not built at that time due to problems caused by the economic crisis of the 1990s.

In the late 2000s there was an attempt to revive this project under the new name Locomoskyner by the Russian company Lokomosky in Ulyanovsk. However, without success and programme was cancelled.

See also 
 EKIP
 Lockheed Martin P-791

References

External links 
 Historical video on hybrid airships with extensive Thermoplan coverage 

Airships of Russia
Russian inventions
Hybrid vehicles
Experimental aircraft
Moscow Aviation Institute